Model Congress gives students a chance to engage in a role-playing simulation of the United States Congress.  Such events are hosted by the Congress itself, Rutgers University, American International College, University of Maryland, Columbia University, Princeton University, the University of Pennsylvania, Yale University, The College of William and Mary, Harvard, Maggie L. Walker Governor's School, Hamburg Area High School (Hamburg, Pennsylvania), and Northgate High school (Walnut Creek, California).

These simulations range in complexity from the government-sponsored Model United States House of Representatives, hosted on Capitol Hill and featuring six Congressional committees to Harvard's simulation featuring both the House and Senate, various committees therein, the Supreme Court, and offshoots in San Francisco, Europe, the Middle East and Asia. North Carolina has a program similar to Model Congress called North Carolina Youth Legislative Assembly, and Arkansas has one called the Arkansas Student Congress on Human Relations. The mock assembly models the North Carolina General Assembly and Arkansas General Assembly but also uses parliamentary procedure based on Robert's Rules of Order.

Awards are available for outstanding delegates, both in committee and in full session. Often, debaters call winning the highest award in a committee or full session "gaveling", and some exceptionally skilled debaters may "double gavel", or win the top award in both committee and full sessions.

American International College's Model Congress Program is the longest-running program of its kind in the United States.

The University of Pennsylvania hosted an intercollegiate Model Congress conference on November 6–7, 2010. Yale University soon followed with a conference on April 23, 2011. The circuit is gradually expanding. World Youth Model Congress, organized by college and high school students from South Korea, is the first of its kind to be held in North-East Asia.

High schools

History
In 1887, Shortridge High School's "Senate", a model congress featuring only one house, was founded by Laura Donnan. In it, students took the roles of real senators to debate the issues of their time. A majority of the Senators were young women, and the Senate gave them a way to participate in the political world which would normally be closed to them. Unfortunately, the club closed with the school in 1981, and its contributions to the world of Model Congress have been forgotten.

The New Rochelle High School Model Congress Club is the longest running high school level model congress in the country. Model Congress originated at New Rochelle High School in 1964 when faculty advisor William P. Clarke sought an extracurricular outlet for bright students not engaged in sports. Richard Nixon was the guest speaker at the club's first mock presidential convention in 1964. Congressman Jamaal Bowman spoke briefly at the club's 58th annual conference at New Rochelle High School in 2022.

New York
Certain High Schools in New York, specifically the Nassau County and Westchester County areas, participate in a competitive debate league known as United Model Congress (UMC). These nine schools get together 8 times during the school year and debate over various pieces of mock legislation just as an actual legislative body would. The schools involved (also known as delegations) are:

New Rochelle High School
Long Beach High School
East Meadow High School
Lawrence High School
Oceanside High School
Herricks High School
George W. Hewlett High School
Seaford High School
Wantagh High School

Wantagh and Seaford are one delegation known as Tri-Delegation, or "Tri-D" for short. Former members of this delegation are J.F. Kennedy and W.C. Mepham high schools of Bellmore-Merrick, and Gen. MacArthur high school of Levittown.

Notable members of UMC include:
Bennett Vergara, current General Chair of NRMC, first cousin twice removed to former NFL player and New Rochelle mayor George Vergara.
Sasha Heller, former Fun Chair of NRMC, accused of being a victim of sex trafficking.
Jeba Karim, former Associate General Chair of NRMC, known for popularizing the phrase "slay" amongst all of UMC
Corey Schwartz, current General Chair of EMMC, ran the first EMMC Congress since 2019 and revived the EMMC Insta 
Nicholas Vagnone, former attendee of Nassau Community College and current plumber’s apprentice, and former Financial Chair of Tri-D.
Skyla Robinson, former General Chair of LBMC.
Elizabeth Balzac, former Financial Chair of HMC.
James Moran, former Tri-D Chair of Tri-D.
Benjamin Armus, former Agenda Chair turned General Chair of LBMC.
Eliot Magalnik, former delegate of HMC.
Benjamin Gerard Garces, former delegate of HMC.
Patrick Moran, former AGC of Tri-D, youngest AGC.
Matthew Guevara, former General Chair of LMC.
Tessa Kurtzman, former General Chair of Tri-D.
Olivia Ginzburg, current General Chair of HMC
Cole Belling, AC of Tri-D XXX
Chris Morale, FC of Tri-D XXX and popularizer of Panera sandwiches as Congress lunch
Each of the listed members above are noteworthy for their skill in debate and lasting impact of United Model Congress.

In March 2020, monthly foreign congresses were suspended due to the COVID-19 pandemic. The first congress to occur since the onset of the pandemic was Tri-D XXX, hosted by Wantagh High School on January 15, 2022.

Many high schools will often attend national model congress competitions at universities such as the University of Pennsylvania and Harvard University.

Students in the Model Congress Club at Maggie L. Walker Governor's School established an annual Model Congress conference known as Walker Model Congress. The first conference was in 2012 and has hosted several hundred delegates from high schools and middle schools nationwide. It is entirely student-led and run with a staff of approximately 100 people.

Choate Rosemary Hall in Wallingford, Connecticut commenced its 39th Model Congress on November 7, 2012 for students in its American Political Institutions course.

In addition to the aforementioned high schools, there are many more that compete in the annual competitions at various universities across the nation. Some of these schools include:

Academy For Software Engineering
Brearley School
Columbia Grammar & Preparatory School
Dalton School
Great Neck North
Horace Mann School
Jericho High School
Richard Montgomery High School
Sanford H. Calhoun High School
Spence School
Syosset High School
The Beacon School
Trevor Day School
Trinity School (New York City)
West Windsor-Plainsboro High School South

Intercollegiate
For many years, Model Congress was only limited to high school students to participate. In November 2010, the University of Pennsylvania hosted the first ever intercollegiate conference, followed by a conference by Yale University in April 2011. Penn and Yale followed with second conferences in 2011-2012, along with Columbia University and Trinity College. The intercollegiate circuit uses the same general rules as high school competitions held by host schools and is rapidly expanding as high school students seek an outlet to continue their participation in Model Congress while in college in ways other than hosting conferences for high school students.

Online

Some iterations of a Model Congress exist online, such as on the website Reddit. Similar model governments exist on the service Discord.

Several House of Commons and historical versions of the United States Government also exist online, particularly on Reddit and Discord.

Model United States Senate
Model United States Senate (MUSS) is a student event intended to simulate the legislative process of the United States Senate.  Various educational bodies organize MUSS events.

Floyd M. Riddick Model United States Senate at Stetson University
Stetson University hosts the United States first and oldest college-level Model United States Senate program annually in Spring. Founded in 1971 by Dr. T. Wayne Bailey, political science professor, and then-political science student John Fraser, Stetson University's Floyd M. Riddick Model U.S. Senate is the nation's oldest collegiate-level Model Senate. Each year, students from colleges and universities around the nation gather at Stetson University for this three-day event.  The F.M.R. Model U.S. Senate reproduces the actual procedures and activities of the United States Senate in an effort to provide experience and education for the student participants. Each student is assigned a Senator in one of five legislative committees (Armed Services, Foreign Relations, HELP, EPW or Judiciary) and is responsible for researching a variety of bills, crafting appropriate amendments and portraying the assigned senator as accurately as possible. In addition, the Model Senate attracts national speakers and lecturers, including former and sitting United States Senators.  In addition, in 2013 the Model Senate Program introduced a journalism program that allows students to live report about the event as well as play the role of real journalists and report on the Model Senate.

DoDDS-Europe MUSS
A conference held in Wiesbaden, Germany every April for 4 days for high school students from all over DODDS Europe participate to simulate the United States Senate, lobby, pass bills, and generally learn about the legislative process that takes place in the United States Senate.

DoDDS-Europe MUSS is organized cooperatively by the teacher board and the appointed student board. The student board is typically composed of six students from six different schools. These six students and the teachers' advisory board usually meet in December to organize most of the conference including creating the theme, designing and ordering T-shirts, pens, folders, etc, setting debate topics and suggesting changes to the conference.

Every participating team and their coach is expected to arrive at the conference location at a specified time, most of the time between 8-10 pm. As the senators and lobbyists arrive they are told the time frame in which they are expected to lobby. Lobbyist represent interest groups, government agencies or any organization that wishes to push for a specific act or bill.

Goucher College Model United States Senate
A group of political science majors at Goucher College created the U.S. Model Senate program as an educational tool to improve high school students’ understanding of the legislative process in the American government and to encourage their political engagement. The current President of this club is William Jenkins. Each student will be assigned to play the role of a real U.S. Senator and will participate in a two-day model senate conference. Over these two days, students will participate in floor sessions, introduce legislation, mark up legislation in committee, and attend party caucuses. They will get a sense of what it is like to be a U.S. Senator and leave with a better understanding of the country's legislative system.

Other MUSS events 
The Bridgewater State College Model United States Senate for High School.

See also
Model United Nations
Harvard Model Congress
Mock trial
Yale Model Congress
YMCA Youth and Government

References

External links
Academy For Software Engineering Model Congress
American International College Model Congress
College of William and Mary Model Congress
Columbia Model Congress
Harvard Model Congress
Penn Model Congress
Princeton Model Congress
Reddit Model United States Government
Reddit United States Government Simulation
Rutgers Model Congress
Stetson Model Senate
Yale Model Congress

American Government Simulation Discord Server

Youth model government
Student debating societies
Youth organizations based in the United States